Ronald Edward Busniuk (born August 13, 1948) is a Canadian former professional ice hockey player. He played 6 games in the National Hockey League, all with the Buffalo Sabres, during the 1973 and 1974. Busniuk then moved to the WHA, playing a total of four full seasons with the Minnesota Fighting Saints, New England Whalers and Edmonton Oilers between 1974 and 1978. Prior to turning professional Busniuk played NCAA hockey for the University of Minnesota Duluth Bulldogs and was an All-American his senior year. After graduation, he played in the AHL with the Nova Scotia Voyageurs and the Cincinnati Swords. He was named to the AHL First All-Star Team.

After retiring as a player, Busniuk became a coach. He led the Thunder Bay Twins Senior Hockey Team to two consecutive championships in the 1980s.  He was later inducted into the Northern Ontario Sports Hall of Fame and the University of Minnesota Duluth Athletic Hall of Fame.

He is the older brother of Mike Busniuk, who also played in the NHL.

Career statistics

Regular season and playoffs

Awards and honours

References

External links
 

1948 births
Living people
AHCA Division I men's ice hockey All-Americans
Buffalo Sabres players
Canadian ice hockey centres
Cincinnati Swords players
Edmonton Oilers (WHA) players
Ice hockey people from Ontario
Minnesota Fighting Saints players
Minnesota Duluth Bulldogs men's ice hockey players
Montreal Voyageurs players
New England Whalers players
Nova Scotia Voyageurs players
Sportspeople from Thunder Bay
Undrafted National Hockey League players